Sana is a Turkish margarine brand that was first released by Unilever's Turkey Branch in 1953 and now owned by Upfield. It is the Turkish variant of Country Crock. It is the first margarine that was wrapped up a packet in Turkey. As it had no other opponent in market and produced from soybean oil that was imported from the U.S., it became the leading margarine brand for decades. It is a generic brand for any margarine produced in Turkey. In Turkish, any margarine is often called Sana yağı. It is the bestseller margarine in the world.

Before the 1980 coup, Sana became a symbol of queues resulting from the shortage of some basic items. After 2000, Sana became various by releasing new products: Sana Zeytinyağlı (aromatized with extra virgin olive oil), Sana Ekmeküstü (ideal for breakfasts), Sana Hamurişi (for pastry), Sana Mutlu Aile (a kind of Sana in the economic category) and Sana Tereyağ Tadında (gives a taste like butter).

In 2018, Unilever margarine division was sold off as Upfield, carrying Sana brand with it.

External links
Sana Official Site

Former Unilever brands
Margarine brands
Products introduced in 1953
Turkish brands